The US Tour was Paul McCartney's second North American concert tour of the 21st century to promote his 2005's Chaos and Creation in the Backyard album. The tour began on 16 September 2005 in Miami, Florida and concluded on 30 November 2005 in Los Angeles, California. It was a commercial success grossing $77 million from 37 shows across North America and selling over 565,000 tickets. Rusty Anderson, Brian Ray, Paul "Wix" Wickens, and Abe Laboriel Jr. returned as the backing band, the first to fully remain intact for more than one solo McCartney tour, following the previous year's summer jaunt in the UK.  McCartney's then-wife Heather Mills and their daughter, Beatrice, accompanied him on the tour and were in the audience every night.

On 12 November 2005 in Anaheim, California, two songs and some dialogue from the concert were broadcast to the International Space Station and astronauts Valeri Tokarev and Bill McArthur. The songs played were The Beatles' "Good Day Sunshine" and McCartney's "English Tea", a song from his Chaos and Creation in the Backyard album.  A concert film and documentary of the tour was released the following year.  It is available on the DVD, The Space Within US.

Set list 
"Magical Mystery Tour" 
"Flaming Pie"
"Jet"
"I'll Get You"
"Drive My Car"
"Till There Was You"
"Let Me Roll It/Foxy Lady"
"Got to Get You into My Life"
"Fine Line"
"Maybe I'm Amazed"
"The Long and Winding Road"
"In Spite of All the Danger"
"I Will"
"Jenny Wren"
"For No One"
"Fixing a Hole"
"English Tea"
"I'll Follow the Sun"
"Follow Me"
"Blackbird"
"Eleanor Rigby"
"Too Many People/She Came In Through the Bathroom Window"
"Good Day Sunshine"
"Band on the Run"
"Penny Lane"
"I've Got a Feeling"
"Back in the U.S.S.R."
"Hey Jude"
"Live And Let Die"
Encore 1
"Yesterday"
"Get Back"
"Helter Skelter"
Encore 2
"Please Please Me"
"Mull of Kintyre" (only in Canada)
"Let It Be"
"Sgt. Pepper's Lonely Hearts Club Band (Reprise)/The End"

Tour dates

Tour band 

 Paul McCartney - Lead vocals, acoustic guitar, electric guitar, bass guitar, and piano
 Rusty Anderson - Backing vocals, acoustic and electric guitars
 Brian Ray - Backing vocals, acoustic, electric and bass guitars
 Paul "Wix" Wickens - Backing vocals, keyboards, accordion, electric guitar, harmonica, percussion
 Abe Laboriel, Jr. - Backing vocals, drums, percussion

References 

2005 concert tours
Paul McCartney concert tours